Elections for local government were held in Northern Ireland on 5 May 2005, contesting 582 seats in all, along with the 2005 general election across the entire United Kingdom and local elections in England.

Results

Councils

Antrim

Ards

Armagh

Ballymena

Ballymoney

Banbridge

Belfast

Carrickfergus

Castlereagh

Coleraine

Cookstown

Craigavon

Derry

Down

Dungannon

Fermanagh

Larne

Limavady

Lisburn

Magherafelt

Moyle

Newry and Mourne

Newtownabbey

North Down

Omagh

Strabane

References

 
2005
Local elections
Local elections